Andreas Fischer may refer to:

 Andreas Fischer (footballer) (born 1964), German football coach and former player
 Andreas Fischer (footballer born 1991) (born 1991), Austrian footballer
 Andreas Fischer (Anabaptist), Austrian/Moravian Anabaptist
 Andreas Fischer (runner) (born 1968), German distance runner and winner at the 1987 European Athletics Junior Championships